Two ships of the Royal Australian Navy (RAN) have been named HMAS Geraldton, for the port of Geraldton, Western Australia.

, a Bathurst-class corvette launched in 1941 and sold to the Turkish Navy in 1946
, a Fremantle-class patrol boat launched in 1983 and decommissioned in 2006

Battle honours
Ships named HMAS Geraldton are entitled to carry three battle honours:
Pacific 1942
Indian Ocean 1942–45
Sicily 1943

References

Royal Australian Navy ship names